The 2020 World Men's Curling Championship (branded as the 2020 LGT World Men's Curling Championship for sponsorship reasons) was scheduled to be held from March 28 to April 5 at the Emirates Arena in Glasgow, Scotland. On March 14, 2020, the World Curling Federation announced the event was cancelled due to the COVID-19 pandemic.

The event was set to be the first event to start gathering points towards the 2022 Winter Olympic Qualification. Upon cancellation, the qualifying process was left unclear.  It was later announced that any country who were scheduled to compete in the event and did not qualify through the 2021 World Championships would take part in a final Olympic Qualifying Tournament in December 2021.

Qualification
The following nations qualified to participate in the 2020 World Men's Curling Championship:

World Ranking
The World Curling Federation World Ranking tracks and lists the success of all Member Associations.

Teams
The teams were to be:

National playdowns
 2020 Tim Hortons Brier
 2020 United States Men's Curling Championship

References

2020 in curling
2020 in Scottish sport
Curling in Scotland
World Men's Curling Championship
World Men's Curling Championship
2020s in Glasgow